William F. Hunter (1855 – April 12, 1918) was a professional baseball player who played catcher in the Major Leagues for the 1884 Louisville Eclipse.  He played in the minors from 1883 to 1887.

External links

1855 births
1918 deaths
19th-century baseball players
Baseball people from Ontario
Canadian expatriate baseball players in the United States
Major League Baseball catchers
Louisville Eclipse players
Hamilton Clippers players
Denver Mountain Lions players
Denver Mountaineers players
Leavenworth Soldiers players
Duluth Freezers players
East Saginaw Grays players
Major League Baseball players from Canada